Eva Wilson may refer to:

Kate 'Eva' Wilson, fictional character, daughter of Sara Fisher (The Passage)
Eva Wilson, fictional character in Atout coeur à Tokyo pour OSS 117